Hillside is a historic house located at 230 Summer Street in Plymouth, Massachusetts.

Description and history 
The -story wood-frame house was built in 1845, and was designed in the Gothic Revival style. It was the site at which Benjamin Watson established one of the nation's first garden nurseries, the "Old Colony Gardens". Also Ralph Waldo Emerson stayed the night here before marrying Plymouth native Lydia Jackson.

The house was listed on the National Register of Historic Places on September 18, 1975.

See also
National Register of Historic Places listings in Plymouth County, Massachusetts

References

Houses in Plymouth, Massachusetts
National Register of Historic Places in Plymouth County, Massachusetts
Houses on the National Register of Historic Places in Plymouth County, Massachusetts
Houses completed in 1845
Gothic Revival architecture in Massachusetts